Vertige de la chute (also known as: Ressaca) is a 2018 French-Brazilian documentary directed by Patrizia Landi and Vincent Rimbaux. The film addresses the struggle of employees of the Municipal Theater of Rio de Janeiro in the midst of the state's economic and political crisis.

Ressaca was aired on Canal Brasil on May 24, 2021, and is available on the Globoplay streaming platform.

Synopsis
Shot entirely in black and white, the documentary tells the daily lives of professionals at the Municipal Theater of Rio de Janeiro in 2017, when then-governor Luiz Fernando Pezão suspended the salaries of the institution's employees.

Accolades

References

External links
Vertige de la chute on IMDb

2018 television films
2018 documentary films
French documentary television films
Brazilian documentary films
Brazilian black-and-white films
French black-and-white films
2010s Portuguese-language films
2010s French films